The Lion King is a 1994 animated Disney film.

The Lion King may also refer to:

 The Lion King (franchise), a media franchise that originated with the film The Lion King
 The Lion King (1994 soundtrack)
 The Lion King (video game), a 1994 video game
 The Lion King (musical), a 1997 Broadway musical 
 The Lion King II: Simba's Pride, a 1998 direct-to-video sequel
 The Lion King: Simba's Mighty Adventure, a 2000 video game
 The Lion King 1½, also known as The Lion King 3: Hakuna Matata, a 2004 direct-to-video sequel
 The Lion King (2019 film), a 2019 photorealistic computer animated remake
 The Lion King (2019 soundtrack)
 The Lion King: The Gift, a secondary soundtrack to the 2019 film, curated by Beyoncé
 MS Rigel III, a ferry known from 1996 to 1998 as the MS Lion King
 Royal coat of arms of the United Kingdom, shows a Lion crowned and a Unicorn, representing England and Scotland
 Coat of arms of the Netherlands
 Coat of arms of Belgium
 Coat of arms of Luxembourg
 Flag of the Republic of Venice
 Simply Heraldry, which uses elements in which can be considered to be a "Lion King"

See also
 King of the Jungle (disambiguation)